The 2019–20 Prairie View A&M Panthers basketball team represented Prairie View A&M University in the 2019–20 NCAA Division I men's basketball season. The Panthers, led by fourth-year head coach Byron Smith, played their home games at the William Nicks Building in Prairie View, Texas as members of the Southwestern Athletic Conference. They finished the season 19–13, 14–4 in SWAC play to be regular season SWAC champions. They defeated Alabama A&M in the quarterfinals of the SWAC tournament and were set to take on Jackson State in the semifinal before the tournament was cancelled amid the COVID-19 pandemic. With the SWAC Tournament cancelled, they were awarded the SWAC's automatic bid to the NCAA tournament. However, the NCAA Tournament was also cancelled.

Previous season
The Panthers finished the 2018–19 season 22–13 overall, 17–1 in SWAC play, to finish as SWAC regular season champions. In the SWAC tournament, they defeated Alcorn State in the quarterfinals, Grambling State in the semifinals advancing to the championship game, where they defeated Texas Southern, earning the SWAC's automatic bid into the NCAA tournament. In the NCAA Tournament, they were matched up against Fairleigh Dickinson in the First Four, resulting in a 76–82 loss for the Panthers.

Roster

Schedule and results

|-
!colspan=12 style=| Non-conference regular season

|-
!colspan=9 style=| SWAC regular season

|-
!colspan=12 style=| SWAC tournament
|-

|- style="background:#bbbbbb"
| style="text-align:center"|March 13, 20202:30 pm, ESPN3
| style="text-align:center"| (1)
| vs. (4) Jackson StateSemifinals
| colspan=2 rowspan=1 style="text-align:center"|Cancelled due to the COVID-19 pandemic
| style="text-align:center"|Bartow ArenaBirmingham, AL
|-

Source

References

Prairie View A&M Panthers basketball seasons
Prairie View AandM Panthers
Prairie View AandM Panthers basketball
Prairie View AandM Panthers basketball